Dynastinae or rhinoceros beetles are a subfamily of the scarab beetle family (Scarabaeidae). Other common names – some for particular groups of rhinoceros beetles – include Hercules beetles, unicorn beetles or horn beetles. Over 1500 species and 225 genera of rhinoceros beetles are known.

Many rhinoceros beetles are well known for their unique shapes and large sizes. Some famous species are, for example, the Atlas beetle (Chalcosoma atlas), common rhinoceros beetle (Xylotrupes ulysses), elephant beetle (Megasoma elephas), European rhinoceros beetle (Oryctes nasicornis), Hercules beetle (Dynastes hercules), Japanese rhinoceros beetle or kabutomushi (Allomyrina dichotoma), ox beetle (Strategus aloeus) and the Eastern Hercules beetle (Dynastes tityus).

Description and ecology

Some species have been anecdotally claimed to lift up to 850 times their own weight. Common names of the Dynastinae refer to the characteristic horns borne only by the males of most species in the group. Each has a horn on the head and another horn pointing forward from the center of the thorax. The horns are used in fighting other males during mating season, and for digging. The size of the horn is a good indicator of nutrition and physical health.

The body of an adult rhinoceros beetle is covered by a thick exoskeleton. A pair of thick wings lie atop another set of membranous wings underneath, allowing the rhinoceros beetle to fly, although not very efficiently, owing to its large size. Their best protection from predators is their size and stature. Additionally, since they are nocturnal, they avoid many of their predators during the day. When the sun is out, they hide under logs or in vegetation to camouflage themselves from the few predators big enough to want to eat them. If rhinoceros beetles are disturbed, some can release very loud, hissing squeaks. The hissing squeaks are created by rubbing their abdomens against the ends of their wing covers. Rhinoceros beetles are relatively resilient; a healthy adult male can live up to 2–3 years. The females rarely live long after they mate.

These beetles' larval stages can be several years long. The larvae feed on rotten wood and the adults feed on nectar, plant sap, and fruit. First, the larvae hatch from eggs and later develop into pupae before they reach adult status (see picture at left). The females lay 50 eggs on average. Contrary to what their size may imply, adult rhinoceros beetles do not eat large amounts, unlike their larvae, which eat a significant amount of rotting wood.

Mating

Male Japanese rhinoceros beetles (Allomyrina dichotoma) fight to dominate sap sites. Males use their horns to pry rival males off the area, which also may give them the chance to mate with a female. In this and other species that defend mating sites, larger males with larger horns mate more frequently, as they win more contests. Small males often avoid larger males and exhibit alternative strategies to gain access to females.

Interactions with humans

Use by humans 
Rhinoceros beetles have become popular pets in parts of Asia, due to being relatively clean, easy to maintain, and safe to handle. Also in Asia, male beetles are used for gambling fights. Since males naturally have the tendency to fight each other for the attention of females, they are the ones used for battle. To get the two male beetles to lock in combat, a female beetle is used, or a small noisemaker duplicating the female's mating call.

Entomologist Séverin Tchibozo suggests the larvae contain much more protein (40%) than chicken (20%) and beef (approximately 18%), and they could become a protein source for a large human population.

Dr. MinJun Kim, leading a team of engineers in National Science Foundation-funded research, examined the function and aerodynamics of Allomyrina dichotoma with the help of researchers in Drexel University's Mechanical Engineering Department and in collaboration with Konkuk University in South Korea. Rhinoceros beetles could play a big part in the next generation of aircraft design.

As pests 
Some species can become major pests, e.g., in tree plantations. Usually though, beetle population densities are not as high as in some other pest insects, and they typically prefer food trees which are already sick or dying from some other cause. Some species' larvae, however, will attack healthy trees or even root vegetables, and when they occur in large numbers, can cause economically significant damage. The fungus Metarhizium majus is a proven biocontrol agent for beetle infestation in crops.

Tribes with selected genera and species

Agaocephalini

Auth: Burmeister, 1847. all genera:
 Aegopsis Burmeister, 1847
 Agaocephala Lepeletier & Audinet-Serville, 1828
 Antodon Brême, 1845
 Brachysiderus Waterhouse, 1881
 Colacus Ohaus, 1910
 Democrates (beetle) Burmeister, 1847
 Gnathogolofa Arrow, 1914
 Horridocalia Endrödi, 1974
 Lycomedes (beetle) Breme, 1844
 Mitracephala Thomson, 1859
 Spodistes Burmeister, 1847

Cyclocephalini

Auth: Laporte, 1840. Selected genera:
 Ancognatha Erichson, 1847
 Cyclocephala Dejean, 1821 (masked chafers)
 Dyscinetus Harold, 1869 (rice beetles)

Dynastini

Auth: MacLeay, 1819. Selected genera:
 Allomyrina Arrow, 1911 (including Trypoxylus)
 Allomyrina dichotoma – Japanese rhinoceros beetle
 Chalcosoma Hope, 1837
Chalcosoma atlas – Atlas beetle
 Chalcosoma moellenkampi – Moellenkampi beetle
 Chalcosoma caucasus – Caucasus beetle
 Dynastes MacLeay, 1819
Dynastes hercules – Hercules beetle
Dynastes neptunus – Neptune beetle
 Eupatorus Burmeister, 1847
Eupatorus gracilicornis – Five-horned rhinoceros beetle
Eupatorus siamensis – Siamese beetle
Eupatorus birmanicus – Rabbit beetle
 Megasoma Kirby, 1825
Megasoma mars - Mars beetle
Megasoma elephas - Elephant beetle
Megasoma actaeon - Actaeon beetle
 Xylotrupes Hope, 1837
Xylotrupes gideon – Siamese rhinoceros beetle
 Xylotrupes ulysses

Hexodontini
Auth. Lacordaire, 1856; genera:
 Hemicyrthus Reiche, 1860
 Hexodon Olivier, 1789
 Hyboschema Péringuey, 1901

Oryctini

Auth: Mulsant, 1842. Selected genera:
 Enema Hope, 1837
 Megaceras Hope, 1837
 Megaceras briansaltini
 Oryctes Hellwig, 1798
 Oryctes nasicornis – European rhinoceros beetle
 Oryctes rhinoceros – Asiatic rhinoceros beetle
 Strategus Kirby, 1828
 Strategus aloeus – ox beetle
 Trichogomphus Burmeister, 1847
 Xyloryctes

Oryctoderini
Auth. Endrödi, 1966; all genera:
 Chalcasthenes Arrow, 1937
 Chalcocrates Heller, 1903
 Coenoryctoderus Prell, 1933
 Hatamus Sharp, 1877
 Melanhyphus Fairmaire, 1881
 Neohyphus Heller, 1896
 Onychionyx Arrow, 1914
 Oryctoderinus Endrödi, 1978
 Oryctoderus Boisduval, 1835
 Paroryctoderus Dechambre, 1994

Pentodontini

Auth: Mulsant, 1842. Selected genera:
 Bothynus Hope, 1837
 Diloboderus Sturm, 1826
 Diloboderus abderus
 Pentodon Hope, 1837
 Pericoptus Burmeister, 1847
 Thronistes Burmeister, 1847
 Tomarus Erichson, 1847

Phileurini

Auth: Burmeister, 1847; selected genera:
 Cryptodus MacLeay, 1819
 Phileurus Latreille, 1807

Notes

Further reading

Dechambre (R.-P.) & Lachaume (G.) The Beetles of the World, volume 27, The genus Oryctes (Dynastidae), Hillside Books, Canterbury

External links

 Family SCARABAEIDAE
 Subfamily Dynastinae

 
Insects as food
Insects in culture